Tsaraphycis mimeticella is a species of snout moth in the genus Tsaraphycis. It was described by Staudinger in 1879. It is found in France, Spain, Iran and Turkey.

References

Moths described in 1879
Phycitinae
Moths of Europe
Insects of Turkey